Slávik was a music poll established by the FORZA company, which had been the main promoter of such poll in Slovakia. The annual awards were permitted live through one of the CME networks, Markíza (1998– 2010), and TV JOJ (2011–2012).

Winners

Major awards

Leaders 
With eight awards having received within the major categories, Elán 
is the most successful band in the so far history of the poll, followed by the Desmod group  and Zuzana Smatanová  who have accumulated a total of seven and six gold trophies, respectively.

Other categories

Successors

See also
 Zlatý slavík
 Český slavík

References

Slovak culture
Zlatý slavík

cs:Zlatý slavík#Český slavík
sk:Zlatý slávik
pl:Zlatý slávik